"Sun täytyy" is a song by Finnish rapper Cheek featuring soul singer Sami Saari. Released in 2007, the song serves as the first single from Cheek's third studio album Kasvukipuja. "Sun täytyy" peaked at number one on the Finnish Singles Chart.

Chart performance

References

2007 songs
2007 singles
Cheek (rapper) songs
Number-one singles in Finland